Erto is the name of:

Erto e Casso, an Italian municipality
Federation of Special Service and Clerical Employees, a Finnish trade union